Diamond Stingily (born 1990) is an American artist and poet. Stingily's art practice explores aspects of identity, iconography and mythology, and childhood. Stingily lives and works in New York City.

Early life and education
Stingily grew up in Chicago, Illinois. As a child, Stingily spent much of her time at her mother's hair salon in West Chicago. Her father, Byron Stingily, is an R&B and house-music singer and her brother, Byron Stingily Jr., is a professional football player.

Stingily studied creative writing at Columbia College.

Work
Stingily has exhibited at numerous galleries and museums, including Ramiken Crucible, Queer Thoughts, The Foire Internationale d'Art Contemporain (FIAC) at the Grand Palais, MOCAD Detroit, and at the New Museum in New York City. Stingily is a published author and holds a podcast-style radio show at Know Wave called The Diamond Stingily Show.

Stingily's earliest project Forever in our Hearts opened at Egg in Chicago in 2014. The project simulated the artist's own death through a funeral arrangement and obituary. The show took place in a storefront display window. Accompanying the display, Stingily wrote an obituary-inspired poem that only existed online and in-print behind the window display. Egg is a project-based space in Chicago founded by artist Puppies Puppies and Forrest Nash (founder of art blog Contemporary Art Daily).

In 2015, Stingily collaborated with artist Martine Syms in Syms' video work Notes on Gestures (2015). Stingily was featured as the central actor in the video which examined body language, reaction GIFs, and the phrase, "Everybody wanna be a black woman but nobody wanna be a black woman." Stingily stayed in New York after their collaboration.

After moving to New York Stingily began creating and showing her Kaas works in group exhibitions such as The End of Violent Crime at Queer Thoughts and Denude at Ramiken Crucible.

'Love, Diamond,' Kaas, and Elephant Memory

Stingily published her first book through Dominica imprint titled, Love, Diamond. The book is a "reprint of the artist's first diary written as an 8-year-old" growing up in Chicago. Stingily has kept most of her journals since she began writing at an early age and was encouraged to write by her grandmother. She has performed readings with fellow artists and writers Justin Allen, Rindon Johnson, Juliana Huxtable, and Andrew Durbin.

Stingily's first solo exhibition, titled Kaas, opened at Queer Thoughts in New York in May 2016. The show featured a number of sculptures made of Kanekalon hair, knockers, barrettes, and beads that referenced both Kaa (the snake character made famous in Rudyard Kipling's The Jungle Book) and Medusa's head of snakes. Later that year, Stingily's second solo exhibition, titled Elephant Memory, opened at Ramiken Crucible in New York. On view were larger and more elaborate Kaas sculptures, used doors with locks, baseball bats, telephone cords, and a video work obstructed by a chain-link fence. The exhibition, "teased out issues of racial violence," in America, specifically Stingily's hometown of Chicago and New York.

In 2017, Artists Space invited Stingily and artist Rindon Johnson to read from recent works alongside artists Justin Allen and Deborah Willis.

Stingily was included in the New Museum's group show Trigger: Gender as a Weapon and a Tool. Stingily created her largest Kaas sculpture-to-date, a hair braid piece that pierced through four floors of the museum. Stingily also showed artwork through Queer Thoughts at FIAC in 2017. Her third solo exhibition, titled Surveillance, opened at Ramiken Crucible in Los Angeles, California in late 2017.

In November 2017, Stingily was selected by Forbes magazine for the prestigious '30 Under 30' in the Arts and Culture section.

Stingily's work was exhibited in the 2018 New Museum Triennial Songs for Sabotage. Her first solo museum show was held at the Institute of Contemporary Art in Miami in 2018.

Themes and critical reception

Stingily's work explores various themes of racial identity and femininity, memory and childhood, iconography, surveillance and paranoia as well as freedom. Much of her work is in direct response to her "social and economic background" growing up in West Chicago.

Critics have reviewed her first two exhibitions favorably. Curator Johanna Fateman writes in Artforum that Diamond's work, "reflects on the normalization and replication of brutal scripts and systems using perfect, pervasive materials." California-based curator Hanna Girma notes that "Stingily courageously navigates between consolation and discomfort, personal and shared memory. Her work celebrates youthful perception, black creativity and resilience while simultaneously thrusting the viewer into their current disposition, with its fear of contact, normalized violence and ancestral hardship."

Exhibitions
Solo exhibitions
 For The People of [__], Freedman Fitzpatrick, Paris, France, 2018
Surveillance, Ramiken Crucible, Los Angeles, CA, 2017
 Elephant Memory, Ramiken Crucible, New York, NY, 2016
 Kaas, Queer Thoughts, New York, NY, 2016
Selected group exhibitions
 Trigger: Gender as a Weapon and a Tool, curated by Johanna Burton, New Museum, New York, NY, 2017
 Where did she go?, with Siera Hyte and Diamond Stingily, Holiday Forever, Jackson Hole, Wyoming, 2016
 Object Anthology, Publishing House, Gstaad, Switzerland, 2016
 Round 43: Small Business/Big Change: Economic Perspectives from Artists and Artrepreneurs, hosted by Martine Syms, Project Row Houses, Houston, TX, 2016
 Denude, Ramiken Crucible, New York, NY, 2015
 The End of Violent Crime, Queer Thoughts, New York, NY, 2015
 Small Pillow, Queer Thoughts at Arcadia Missa, London, UK, 2015
 Rainbow, Queer Thoughts, Nicaragua, 2015
 Forever in our Hearts, EGG, Chicago, IL, 2014

See also 

 Dozie Kanu

References

External links 
 Diamond Stingily at 315 Gallery Brooklyn, New York

Living people
American artists
Columbia College Chicago alumni
1990 births
21st-century American poets